Donald Earle DeGrate Jr. (born September 29, 1969), better known by his stage name DeVanté Swing, is an American record producer, singer, rapper and songwriter. 
He is the older brother of fellow Jodeci member Dalvin DeGrate.

Career

In his early career, Swing served as a mix engineer, while simultaneously producing for other acts. He mix-engineered Hi-Five’s "I Just Can't Handle It" as well as producing several remixes for the track. Swing rose to prominence in the 1990s as the founding member of the R&B group Jodeci, one of the most notable R&B acts of all time. Swing served as the main songwriter, producer and leader of the group. Jodeci also featured his younger brother Dalvin DeGrate. Swing is also credited for discovering several groundbreaking acts such as Timbaland, Missy Elliott, Ginuwine, Stevie J and Static Major. He is also credited as a video director for Jodeci, co-directing the videos for "Feenin'" with the legendary Hype Williams and "Freek'n You" with Brett Ratner.

Swing also mentored Flo Rida in the early stages of his career.

Discography

Forever My Lady (1991)
Diary of a Mad Band (1993)
The Show, the After Party, the Hotel (1995)
The Past, the Present, the Future (2015)

References

External links
Devante Swing Interview with Sterlen Roberts
James T. Jones IV (March 10, 1992). "Jodeci throws its voice into the doo-wop". USA Today, p. 4D

Record producers from Virginia
American soul singers
Jodeci members
Living people
Place of birth missing (living people)
American hip hop singers
Singer-songwriters from Virginia
Musicians from Hampton, Virginia
1969 births
African-American male songwriters
21st-century African-American male singers
20th-century African-American male singers